The euro short-term rate (€STR) is a reference rate for the currency euro. The €STR is calculated by the European Central Bank (ECB) and is based on the money market statistical reporting of the Eurosystem.  The working group on euro risk-free rates has recommended €STR as a replacement for the EMMI Euro Overnight Index Average (EONIA) as the Euro risk-free rate for all products and contracts.

History
20 September 2017: ECB's Governing Council has decided to develop a euro short-term rate based on data collected by the Eurosystem for money market statistical purposes.

13 September 2018: The working group on euro risk-free rates recommends to replace the EONIA with the euro short-term rate.

12 March 2019: The ECB decided to use the acronym “€STR“.

2 October 2019: Start publishing the rate.

Characteristics
Characteristics of the €STR:

 The €STR is published by the ECB.
 It is based on the unsecured market segment. The ECB developed an unsecured rate, because it is intended to complement the EONIA. Furthermore, a secured rate would be affected by the type of the collaterals.
 The money market statistical reporting covers the 50 largest banks in the euro area in terms of balance sheet size.
 While the EONIA reflects the interbank market, the €STR extends the scope to money market funds, insurance companies and other financial corporations because banks developed significant money market activity with those entities.

The ISIN is EU000A2X2A25.

Methodology

Overnight rate

The €STR is calculated using overnight unsecured fixed rate deposit transactions over €1 million.

For each TARGET2 business day the €STR is calculated as a volume-weighted trimmed mean.

Steps of the calculation:

 Ordering the transactions from the lowest rate to the highest rate.
 Aggregating the transactions at each rate level.
 Removing the top and bottom 25% in volume terms (trimming).
 Calculating the mean of the remaining 50% and rounding to the third decimal.

The €STR is published on every TARGET2 business day at 8:00 CET (reflecting the trading activity of the previous business day). If errors are detected, the €STR is revised and republished on the same day at 9:00 CET.

Forward-looking term structure
An OIS quotes-based methodology as  the  €STR-based  forward-looking  term  structure  methodology is recommended as  a  fallback  to  Euribor-linked contracts. The working group will analyse further approaches.

See also
 SARON
 SOFR

References

External links
 
 
 

Eurozone
Banking
Interest rates